Jitender may refer to:

 Jitender Singh Malik, Indian politician;
 Jitender Singh Tomar, Indian politician;
 Jitender Kumar (boxer, born 1988);
 Jitender Kumar (boxer, born 1977);